The 1909–10 Chicago Maroons men's basketball team represented the University of Chicago in intercollegiate basketball during the 1909–10 season. The team finished the season with a 10–3 record  This was the fourth consecutive season for which Chicago was the Western Conference champion.  The team played their home games on campus at Frank Dickinson Bartlett Gymnasium.

At seasons end, Pat Page was named an All-American, while also being named the Helms Foundation National Player of the Year. For Page, it was his fourth consecutive All-American honor; for the University, it was the second Helms National Player of the Year award earned by a player.

Roster

Head Coach: Joseph Raycroft (4th year at Chicago)

Schedule
Source											

|-	

|- align="center" bgcolor=""

	

					

|-

References

Chicago Maroons men's basketball seasons
Chicago
Chicago Maroons Men's Basketball Team
Chicago Maroons Men's Basketball Team